The 2014 World RX of Great Britain was the 2nd round of the inaugural season of the FIA World Rallycross Championship.

Heats

Semi-finals

Semi-final 1

Semi-final 2

Final

† Reinis Nitišs was unable to take the start of the final. Tanner Foust was allowed to race by the stewards.

Championship standings after the event

References

External links

|- style="text-align:center"
|width="35%"|Previous race:2014 World RX of Portugal
|width="30%"|FIA World Rallycross Championship2014 season
|width="35%"|Next race:2014 World RX of Norway
|- style="text-align:center"
|width="35%"|Previous race:None
|width="30%"|World RX of Great Britain
|width="35%"|Next race:2015 World RX of Great Britain
|- style="text-align:center"

Great Britain
World RX